Cecilia Guillenea (born 24 January 1981) is an Uruguayan former professional tennis player.

Guillenea played for the Uruguay Fed Cup team between 1997 and 2000, winning four singles and six doubles rubbers, from a total of 15 ties. She also represented Uruguay at the 1998 World Youth Games and was a bronze medalist at the 1998 South American Games in Ecuador, partnering Daniela Peyrot in the women's doubles.

Competing on the ITF Women's Circuit, Guillenea reached her best singles ranking of 425 in the world in 2000 and won both of her two career titles that year, at Lima and La Paz. She won a further two ITF tournaments in doubles and had a career high doubles ranking of 395.

ITF finals

Singles: 2 (2–0)

Doubles: 2 (2–0)

References

External links
 
 
 

1981 births
Living people
Uruguayan female tennis players
Competitors at the 1998 South American Games
South American Games medalists in tennis
South American Games bronze medalists for Uruguay
20th-century Uruguayan women
21st-century Uruguayan women